Razzmatazz is an Indian dance reality show and competition that was broadcast on Zee TV in 2001. It The show was hosted by Arshad Warsi and Shweta Menon.

Show format
The contestants' are divided into two separate groups, where the contestants' from each of the group perform their dancing skills to obtain points.

References

External links

Indian reality television series
Zee TV original programming
2001 Indian television series debuts
2001 Indian television series endings
Indian dance television shows